Korgalzhyn may refer to:

Korgalzhyn, a village in Akmola Region, Kazakhstan 
Korgalzhyn District, a district in Kazakhstan
Korgalzhyn (lake), a lake of the Tengiz basin, Kazakhstan
Korgalzhyn Nature Reserve, a protected area in Kazakhstan